K82 or K-82 may refer to:

K-82 (Kansas highway), a state highway in Kansas
HMS Larkspur (K82), a former UK Royal Navy ship
INS Veer (K82), a former Indian Navy ship